Trichocentrum carthagenense, also known as the Coot Bay dancing lady orchid, is a species of orchid found from the Everglades, the Caribbean and Mexico, Central America and down to northern Brazil. The species name refers to the Cartagena, Colombia, where it was first collected in 1760.

References

External links 

carthagenense
Orchids of Central America
Orchids of Belize
Orchids of Brazil
Orchids of Mexico
Flora of the Caribbean
Flora without expected TNC conservation status